Nellallitea "Nella" Larsen (born Nellie Walker; April 13, 1891 – March 30, 1964) was an American novelist. Working as a nurse and a librarian, she published two novels, Quicksand (1928) and Passing (1929), and a few short stories. Though her literary output was scant, she earned recognition by her contemporaries.

A revival of interest in her writing has occurred since the late 20th century, when issues of racial and sexual identity have been studied. Her works have been the subjects of numerous academic studies, and she is now widely lauded as "not only the premier novelist of the Harlem Renaissance, but also an important figure in American modernism."

Early life
Nella Larsen was born Nellie Walker, in a poor district of south Chicago known as the Levee, on April 13, 1891. Her mother was Pederline Marie Hansen, a Danish immigrant, born 1868 in Brahetrolleborg parish on the island of Fyn (Funen). Her mother, who went by Mary Larsen (sometimes misspelled Larson) in the U.S., worked as a seamstress and domestic worker in Chicago. She would die in 1951 in Santa Monica, Los Angeles County.

Her father was Peter Walker, believed to be a mixed-race Afro-Caribbean immigrant from the Danish West Indies. He was probably a descendant on his paternal side of Henry or George Walker, white men from Albany, New York who were known to have settled in the Danish West Indies in about 1840. In that Danish colonial society, racial lines were more fluid than in the former slave states of the United States. Walker may never have identified as "Negro." He soon disappeared from the lives of Nella and her mother; she said he had died when she was very young. At this time, Chicago was filled with immigrants, but the Great Migration of blacks from the South had not begun. Near the end of Walker's childhood, the black population of the city was 1.3% in 1890 and 2% in 1910.

Marie married again, to Peter Larsen aka Peter Larson (b. 1867), a fellow Danish immigrant. In 1892 the couple had a daughter Anna Elizabeth aka Lizzie (married name Gardner) together. Nellie took her stepfather's surname, sometimes using versions spelled Nellye Larson and Nellie Larsen, before settling finally on Nella Larsen. The mixed family moved west to a mostly white neighborhood of German and Scandinavian immigrants, but encountered discrimination because of Nella. When Nella was eight, they moved a few blocks back east.

The American author and critic Darryl Pinckney wrote of her anomalous situation:
as a member of a white immigrant family, she [Larsen] had no entrée into the world of the blues or of the black church. If she could never be white like her mother and sister, neither could she ever be black in quite the same way that Langston Hughes and his characters were black. Hers was a netherworld, unrecognizable historically and too painful to dredge up.

From 1895 to 1898, Larsen visited Denmark with her mother and her half-sister.  While she was unusual in Denmark because of being of mixed race, she had some good memories from that time, including playing Danish children’s games, which she later wrote about in English. After returning to Chicago in 1898, she attended a large public school. At the same time as the migration of Southern blacks increased to the city, so had European immigration. Racial segregation and tensions had increased in the immigrant neighborhoods, where both groups competed for jobs and housing.

Her mother believed that education could give Larsen an opportunity and supported her in attending Fisk University, a historically black university in Nashville, Tennessee. A student there in 1907–08, for the first time Larsen was living within an African-American community, but she was still separated by her own background and life experiences from most of the students, who were primarily from the South, with most descended from former slaves. Biographer George B. Hutchinson found that Larsen was expelled for some violation of Fisk's strict dress or conduct codes for women.  Larsen went on her own to Denmark, where she lived for a total of three years, between 1909 and 1912, and attended the University of Copenhagen. After returning to the United States, she continued to struggle to find a place where she could belong.

Nursing career
In 1914, Larsen enrolled in the nursing school at New York City's Lincoln Hospital and Nursing Home. The institution was founded in the 19th century in Manhattan as a nursing home to serve black people, but the hospital elements had grown in importance. The total operation had been relocated to a newly constructed campus in the South Bronx. At the time, the hospital patients were primarily white; the nursing home patients were primarily black; the doctors were white males; and the nurses and nursing students were black females. As Pinckney writes: "No matter what situation Larsen found herself in, racial irony of one kind or another invariably wrapped itself around her."

Upon graduating in 1915, Larsen went South to work at the Tuskegee Institute in Tuskegee, Alabama, where she soon became head nurse at its hospital and training school. While at Tuskegee, she was introduced to Booker T. Washington's model of education and became disillusioned with it. As it was combined with poor working conditions for nurses at Tuskegee, Larsen decided to leave after a year or so.

She returned to New York in 1916, where she worked for two years as a nurse at Lincoln Hospital. After earning the second-highest score on a civil service exam, Larsen was hired by the city Bureau of Public Health as a nurse. She worked for them in the Bronx through the 1918 flu pandemic, in "mostly white neighborhoods" and with white colleagues. Afterwards she continued with the city as a nurse.

Marriage and family
In 1919, Larsen married Elmer Imes, a prominent physicist; he was the second African American to earn a PhD in physics. After her marriage, she sometimes used the name Nella Larsen Imes in her writing. A year after her marriage, she published her first short stories.

The couple moved to Harlem in the 1920s, where their marriage and life together had contradictions of class. As Pinckney writes:

By virtue of her marriage, she was a member of Harlem's black professional class, many of them people of color with partially European ancestry. She and her husband knew the NAACP leadership: W.E.B. Du Bois, Walter White, James Weldon Johnson. However, because of her low birth and mixed parentage, and because she did not have a college degree, Larsen was alienated from the black middle class, whose members emphasized college and family ties, and black fraternities and sororities.

Her mixed racial ancestry was not itself unusual in the black middle class. But many of these individuals, such as Langston Hughes, had more distant European ancestors. He and others formed an elite of mixed race or people of color, some of whom had ancestors who had been free people of color well before the American Civil War. This had given many families an advantage in establishing themselves and gaining educations in the North. In the 1920s, most African Americans in Harlem were exploring and emphasizing their black heritage.

Imes's scientific studies and achievement placed him in a different class than Larsen. The Imes couple had difficulties by the late 1920s, when he had an affair with a white woman at Fisk University, where he was a professor. Imes and Larsen would divorce in 1933.

Librarian and literary career

In 1921 Larsen worked nights and weekends as a volunteer with librarian Ernestine Rose, to help prepare for the first exhibit of "Negro art" at the New York Public Library (NYPL). Encouraged by Rose, she became the first black woman to graduate from the NYPL Library School. It was run by Columbia University and opened the way for integration of library staff.

Larsen passed her certification exam in 1923. She worked her first year as a librarian at the Seward Park Branch on the Lower East Side, which was predominantly Jewish. There she had strong support from her white supervisor Alice Keats O'Connor, as she had from Rose. They, and another branch supervisor where she worked, supported Larsen and helped integrate the staff of the branches. Larsen transferred to the Harlem branch, as she was interested in the cultural excitement in the African-American neighborhood, a destination for migrants from across the country.

In October 1925, Larsen took a sabbatical from her job for health reasons and began to write her first novel. In 1926, having made friends with important figures in the Negro Awakening (which became known as the Harlem Renaissance), Larsen gave up her work as a librarian.

She became a writer active in Harlem's interracial literary and arts community, where she became friends with Carl Van Vechten, a white photographer and writer. In 1928, Larsen published Quicksand, a largely autobiographical novel. It received significant critical acclaim, if not great financial success.

In 1929, she published Passing, her second novel, which was also critically successful. It dealt with issues of two mixed-race African-American women who were childhood friends and had taken different paths of racial identification and marriage. One identified as black and married a black doctor; the other passed as white and married a white man, without revealing her African ancestry. The book explored their experiences of coming together again as adults.

In 1930, Larsen published "Sanctuary", a short story for which she was accused of plagiarism. "Sanctuary" was said to resemble the British writer Sheila Kaye-Smith's short story, "Mrs. Adis", first published in the United Kingdom in 1919. Kaye-Smith wrote on rural themes, and was very popular in the US. Some critics thought the basic plot of "Sanctuary," and some of the descriptions and dialogue, were virtually identical to Kaye-Smith's work.

The scholar H. Pearce has disputed this assessment, writing that, compared to Kaye-Smith's tale, "Sanctuary" is ' ... longer, better written and more explicitly political, specifically around issues of race - rather than class as in 'Mrs Adis'." Pearce thinks that Larsen reworked and updated the tale into a modern American black context. Pearce also notes that in Kaye-Smith's 1956 book, All the Books of My Life, the author said she had based "Mrs Adis" on a 17th-century story by St Francis de Sales, Catholic bishop of Geneva. It is unknown whether she knew of the Larsen controversy in the United States. Larsen herself said the story came to her as "almost folk-lore," recounted to her by a patient when she was a nurse.

No plagiarism charges were proved. Larsen received a Guggenheim Fellowship even in the aftermath of the controversy, worth roughly $2,500 at the time, and was the first African-American woman to do so. She used it to travel to Europe for several years, spending time in Mallorca and Paris, where she worked on a novel about a love triangle in which all the protagonists were white. She never published the book or any other works.

Later life

Larsen returned to New York in 1937, when her divorce had been completed. She was given a generous alimony in the divorce, which gave her the financial security she needed until Imes's death in 1941. Struggling with depression, Larsen stopped writing. After her ex-husband's death, Larsen returned to nursing and became an administrator. She disappeared from literary circles. She lived on the Lower East Side and did not venture to Harlem.

Many of her old acquaintances speculated that she, like some of the characters in her fiction, had crossed the color line to "pass" into the white community. Biographer George Hutchinson has demonstrated in his 2006 work that she remained in New York, working as a nurse.

Some literary scholars have engaged in speculation and interpretation of Larsen's decision to return to nursing, viewing her decision to take time off from writing as "an act of self-burial, or a 'retreat' motivated by a lack of courage and dedication." What they overlooked is that during that time period, it was difficult for a woman of color to find a stable job that would also provide financial stability. For Larsen, nursing was a "labor market that welcomed an African American as a domestic servant". Nursing had been something that came naturally to Larsen as it was "one respectable option for support during the process of learning about the work." During her work as a nurse, Larsen was noticed by Adah Thoms, an African-American nurse who co-founded the National Association of Colored Graduate Nurses. Thoms had seen potential in Larsen's nursing career and helped strengthen Larsen's  skills. Once Larsen graduated in 1915, it was Adah Thoms who had made arrangements for Larsen to work at Tuskegee Institute's John A. Andrew Memorial Hospital.

Larsen draws from her medical background in Passing to create the character of Brian, a doctor and husband of the main character. Larsen describes Brian as being ambivalent about his work in the medical field. Brian's character may also be partially modeled on Larsen's husband Elmer Imes, a physicist.  After Imes divorced Larsen, he was closely associated with Ethel Gilbert, Fisk Director of public relations and manager of the Fisk Jubilee Singers, although it is unclear if the two married.

Larsen died in her Brooklyn apartment in 1964, at the age of 72.

Legacy 
In 2018, The New York Times published a belated obituary for her.

Nella Larsen was an acclaimed novelist, who wrote stories in the midst on the Harlem Renaissance. Larsen is most known for her two novels, Passing and Quicksand; these two pieces of work got much recognition with positive reviews. Many believed that Larsen was a rising star as an African American novelist, until she soon after left Harlem, her fame, and writing behind.

Larsen is often compared to other authors who also wrote about cultural and racial conflict such as Claude Mckay and Jean Toomer.

Nella Larsen’s works are viewed as strong pieces that well represent mixed-race individuals and the struggles with identity that some inevitably face.

There have been some arguments that Larsen’s work did not well represent the “New Negro” movement because of the main characters in her novels being confused and struggling with their race. However, others argue that her work was a raw and important representation of how life was for many people, especially females, during the Harlem Renaissance.

Larsen’s novel Passing was adapted as a 2021 film of the same name by Rebecca Hall.

Works

1928: Quicksand

Helga Crane is a fictional character loosely based on Larsen's experiences in her early life.  Crane is the lovely and refined mixed-race daughter of a Danish white mother and a West Indian black father.  Her father died soon after she was born. Unable to feel comfortable with her maternal European-American relatives, Crane lives in various places in the United States and visits Denmark, searching for people among whom she feels at home. As writer Amina Gautier points out, "in a mere 135 pages, Larsen details five different geographical spaces and each space Helga Crane moves to or through alludes to a different stage in her emotional and psychological growth."

Nella Larsen's early life is similar to Helga's in that she was distant from the African-American community, including her African-American family members. Larsen and Helga did not have father figures.  Both of their mothers decided to marry a white man with the hope of having a higher social status. Larsen wanted to learn more about her background so she continued to go to school during the Harlem Renaissance. Even though Larsen's early life parallels Helga's, in adulthood, their life choices end up being very different. Nella Larsen pursued a career in nursing while Helga married a preacher and stayed in a very unhappy marriage.

In her travels she encounters many of the communities which Larsen knew. For example, Crane teaches at Naxos, a Southern Negro boarding school (based on Tuskegee University), where she becomes dissatisfied with its philosophy. She criticizes a sermon by a white preacher, who advocates the segregation of blacks into separate schools and says their striving for social equality would lead blacks to become avaricious. Crane quits teaching and moves to Chicago. Her white maternal uncle, now married to a bigoted woman, shuns her. Crane moves to Harlem, New York, where she finds a refined but often hypocritical black middle class obsessed with the "race problem."

Taking her uncle's legacy, Crane visits her maternal aunt in Copenhagen. There she is treated as an attractive racial exotic. Missing black people, she returns to New York City.  Close to a mental breakdown, Crane happens onto a store-front revival and has a charismatic religious experience. After marrying the preacher who converted her, she moves with him to the rural Deep South. There she is disillusioned by the people's adherence to religion. In each of her moves, Crane fails to find fulfillment. She is looking for more than how to integrate her mixed ancestry. She expresses complex feelings about what she and her friends consider genetic differences between races.

The novel develops Crane's search for a marriage partner. As it opens, she has become engaged to marry a prominent Southern Negro man, whom she does not really love, but with whom she can gain social benefits. In Denmark she turns down the proposal of a famous white Danish artist for similar reasons, for lack of feeling. By the final chapters, Crane has married a black Southern preacher. The novel's close is deeply pessimistic. Crane had hoped to find sexual fulfillment in marriage and some success in helping the poor Southern blacks she lives among, but instead she has frequent pregnancies and suffering. Disillusioned with religion, her husband, and her life, Crane fantasizes about leaving her husband, but never does.
"She sinks into a slough of disillusionment and indifference. She tries to fight her way back to her own world, but she is too weak, and circumstances are too strong."

The critics were impressed with the novel. They appreciated her more indirect take on important topics such as race, class, sexuality, and other issues important to the African-American community rather than the explicit or obvious take of other Harlem Renaissance writers. For example, the New York Times reviewer found it "an articulate, sympathetic first novel" which demonstrated an understanding that "a novelist's business is primarily with individuals and not with classes." The novel also won Larsen a bronze prize (second place) for literature in 1928 from the William E. Harmon Foundation.

1929: Passing
 Larsen's novel Passing  begins with Irene receiving a mysterious letter from her childhood friend Clare, following their encounter at the Drayton Hotel, after twelve years with no communication. Irene and Clare lost contact with each other after the death of Clare's father Bob Kendry, when Clare was sent to live with her white aunts. Both Irene and Clare are of mixed African-European ancestry, with features that enable them to pass racially as "white" if they choose. Clare chose to pass into white society and married John Bellew, a white man described as a racist. Unlike Clare, Irene passes as white only on occasion, for her convenience in negotiating some segregated spaces. Irene identifies as a black woman, and married an African-American doctor named Brian; together they have two sons. After Irene and Clare reconnect, they become fascinated with the differences in their lives. One day Irene meets with Clare and Gertrude, another of their childhood African-American friends; during that meeting Mr. Bellew meets Irene and Gertrude. Bellew greets his wife with a racial comment as if he did not know she was half black.

Irene becomes furious that Clare did not tell her husband about her full ancestry. Irene believes Clare has put herself in a dangerous situation by lying to a person who hates blacks. After meeting Clare's husband, Irene does not want anything more to do with Clare but still keeps in touch with her. Clare begins to join Irene and Brian for their events in Harlem, New York while her husband is traveling out of town. Because Irene has some jealousy of Clare, she begins to suspect her friend is having an affair with her husband Brian. The novel ends with John Bellew learning that Clare is mixed race. At a party in Harlem, she falls out of a window from a high floor of a multi-story building, to her death, under ambiguous circumstances. Larsen ends the novel without revealing if Clare committed suicide, if Irene or John pushed her, or if it was an accident.

The novel was well received by the few critics who reviewed it. Writer and scholar W. E. B. Du Bois hailed it as the "one of the finest novels of the year."

Some later critics described the novel as an example of the genre of the tragic mulatto, a common figure in early African-American literature after the American Civil War. In such works, it is usually a woman of mixed race who is portrayed as tragic, as she has difficulty marrying and finding a place to fit into society. Others suggest that this novel complicates that plot by playing with the duality of the figures of Irene and Clare, who are of similar mixed-race background but have taken different paths in life. The novel also suggests attraction between them and erotic undertones in the two women's relationship. Irene's husband is also portrayed as potentially bisexual, as if the characters are passing in their sexual as well as social identities. Some read the novel as one of repression. Others argue that through its attention to the way "passing" unhinges ideas of race, class, and gender, the novel opens spaces for the creation of new, self-generated identities.

Since the late 20th century, Passing has received renewed attention from scholars because of its close examination of racial and sexual ambiguities and liminal spaces. It has achieved canonical status in many American universities.

Bibliography

Books
 Quicksand (1928)
 Passing (1929)

Short stories
 "Freedom" (1926)
 "The Wrong Man" (1926)
 "Playtime: Three Scandinavian Games", The Brownies' Book, 1 (June 1920): 191–192.
 "Playtime: Danish Fun", The Brownies' Book, 1 (July 1920): 219.
 "Correspondence", Opportunity, 4 (September 1926): 295.
 "Review of Black Spade," Opportunity, 7 (January 1929): 24.
 "Sanctuary", Forum, 83 (January 1930): 15–18.
 "The Author's Explanation", Forum, Supplement 4, 83 (April 1930): 41–42.

Notes

References
 Hutchinson, George (2006), In Search of Nella Larsen: A Biography of the Color Line, Harvard University Press.
 Pearce, H. (2003), "Mrs Adis & Sanctuary", The Gleam: Journal of the Sheila Kaye-Smith Society, No. 16.
 Pinckney, Darryl, "Shadows", The Nation, July 17/24, 2006, pp. 26–30. Review: Hutchinson's In Search of Nella Larsen: A Biography of the Color Line.

Further reading

 Clark Barwick, "A History of Passing." South Atlantic Review 84.2–3 (2019): 24–54.
 Thadious M. Davis (1994), Nella Larsen, Novelist of the Harlem Renaissance: A Woman's Life Unveiled. (Baton Rouge : Louisiana State University Press).
George Hutchinson, In Search of Nella Larsen: A Biography of the Color Line (Cambridge, Massachusetts; London, England: The Belknap Press of Harvard University Press, 2006).
Deborah E. McDowell, "Introduction" in Deborah E. McDowell (ed.), Quicksand and Passing: Nella Larsen (New Brunswick, N.J.: Rutgers University Press, 1986). ix–xxxv.
Martha J. Cutter, "Sliding Significations: Passing as a Narrative and Textual Strategy in Nella Larsen's Fiction," in Elaine Ginsberg (ed.), Passing and the Fictions of Identity, Duke University Press, 1996, pp. 75–100.
 Nikki Hall, "Passing, Present, Future: The Intersectional Prescience of Nella Larsen's 1929 Classic," in B*tch magazine, (Re)Vision issue, Winter 2015.
 Sheila Kaye-Smith (1956), All the Books of My Life, London: Cassell, 1956.
 Charles R. Larson (1993), Invisible Darkness: Jean Toomer and Nella Larsen.
 Bonnie Wertheim, "Nella Larsen, 1891–1964", The New York Times, March 8, 2018.

External links

 
 Quicksand, scanned original edition at Hathi Trust 
 Passing at the Internet Archive (scanned book original edition)
 "Nella Larsen", links, secondary bibliography, Washington State University

1891 births
1964 deaths
20th-century African-American women writers
20th-century African-American writers
20th-century American novelists
20th-century American short story writers
20th-century American women writers
African-American librarians
African-American novelists
African-American nurses
American librarians
American nurses
American people of Danish descent
American women librarians
American women novelists
American women nurses
American women short story writers
Fisk University alumni
Harlem Renaissance
Novelists from Illinois
Novelists from New York (state)
People involved in plagiarism controversies
Writers from Brooklyn
Writers from Chicago